The Masterclass Media Foundation is a non profit organisation and UK registered charity (No 1113002) which films and records some of the world’s great musicians teaching and giving masterclasses.    The Foundation has two aims: first to create an archive of such masterclasses for the benefit of future generations of students and scholars and secondly to make them available on DVDs and eventually through the internet, to music schools and students throughout the world.  It works closely with the most prestigious music schools and has filmed musicians of the calibre of Maxim Vengerov, András Schiff, Bernard Haitink, Stephen Kovacevich, Kurt Masur, Stephen Hough, Evelyn Glennie, Yuri Bashmet, Håkan Hardenberger and Thomas Quasthoff.

Organisation and funding 

The foundation is based in Bristol, UK. It is funded partly by income from sales of its DVDs and partly through charitable donations and grants.  The Chief Executive is Mischa Scorer.

Achievements 

•	The MMF has released over 50 hours of masterclasses on 35 DVDs with a roster of musicians, including violin with Maxim Vengerov, piano with András Schiff, Stephen Kovacevich, Emanuel Ax, Joanna MacGregor and Stephen Hough, cello with Steven Isserlis and Frans Helmerson, conducting with Bernard Haitink, Simon Carrington and Kurt Masur, singing with Thomas Quasthoff and Joan Rodgers, percussion with Evelyn Glennie, trumpet with Håkan Hardenberger, viola with Yuri Bashmet, chamber music with Gábor Takács-Nagy and many others.

•	The MMF has won acclaim in the specialist music press, notably in The Gramophone, The BBC Music Magazine, The Strad and International Piano Magazine (which awarded the MMF its “Educational DVD of the Year 2009”).

•	Over 100 conservatoires worldwide have MMF masterclasses in their libraries – most have complete sets.  Its customer base now also includes individual students in 60 countries.

•	Extracts from MMF masterclasses have received almost a million hits on YouTube.

•	In 2010 the MMF was recognised by Arts Council England with a substantial lottery award.

•	The MMF has created audio files of all masterclasses for the benefit of blind and partially sighted people.  These are being donated to the National Library Service of the RNIB in the UK. The US Library of Congress service for the blind has also ordered a complete set.

•	14 Academy Schools in the UK specialising in music have been given full sets free of charge.

•	By the end of 2010 masterclasses will be available digitally for streaming and downloading.

•	A number of important academic institutions including The British Library have asked to house the entire archive in perpetuity.

References

External links 
Masterclass Media Foundation Website

Music education in the United Kingdom
Music organisations based in the United Kingdom
Organisations based in Bristol